Martin Burgoyne (1963 – November 30, 1986) was a British-born artist. Burgoyne befriended singer Madonna before she was famous and he was a key figure in her early career. He managed her first club tour and designed the cover for her 1983 single "Burning Up."

Life and career 
Born in England, Burgoyne's family moved to Florida during his childhood. Drawn to the excitement of New York, Burgoyne moved to Manhattan to study art at the Pratt Institute in the early 1980s. Upon arriving, Steve Rubell, co-owner of Studio 54, hired him as a bartender. He was later a bartender at Erika Belle's Lucky Strike on East 9th Street and Third Avenue in Downtown Manhattan.

Burgoyne met and befriended up-and-coming singer Madonna and the two became roommates. Burgoyne was one of Madonna's early dancers following the release of her single "Everybody" on Sire Records in October 1982. Since Burgoyne was not a professional dancer, he was dropped from the troupe, but he was the road manager for her first club tour. Burgoyne also designed the cover sleeve for her 1983 single "Burning Up." He worked with Liz Rosenberg, a public relations executive with Sire's parent label Warner Bros. Records, to design covers for various artists.

Burgoyne designed the original cover for Madonna's debut album, which was slated to be titled Lucky Star but ended up being self-titled. According to Seymour Stein, co-founder of Sire Records and vice president of Warner Bros. Records, Madonna discreetly asked A&R executive Michael Rosenblatt to decline Burgoyne's sleeve design for her album because "it just wasn't iconic enough." However, they maintained a close relationship and shared a circle of friends, which included artists Andy Warhol, Keith Haring, and Jean-Michel Basquiat. Burgoyne invited Warhol to be his date to Madonna's wedding in August 1985.

In the summer of 1986, Burgoyne became ill with what initially was thought to be measles. In August 1986, he was diagnosed with AIDS-related complex (ARC). In September 1986, a fundraising party was organized by Deb Parker at the Pyramid Club in the East Village. The event raised  $6,000 for Burgoyne's medical and living expenses. Among the guests were Andy Warhol and Keith Haring, who both designed the invitation, Kenny Scharf, who performed at the event, Anita Sarko, Steve Rubell, and Madonna. The New York Times wrote an article covering the event as the AIDS epidemic was devastating a generation of predominantly gay men. Madonna paid for Burgoyne's medical expenses at St. Vincent's Hospital. She also leased an apartment for him on West 12th Street in Greenwich Village, so that he could be closer to the hospital. On November 10, Madonna modeled a denim jacket painted by Burgoyne at an AIDS benefit fashion show for St. Vincent's Hospital.

Burgoyne died at 23 years old of AIDS-related complications on November 30, 1986. He is buried at Brookside Cemetery in Watertown, New York. During Madonna's Who's That Girl World Tour in July 1987, she held a benefit concert at Madison Square Garden for AIDS Research (AmfAR) and dedicated her performance of "Live to Tell" to Burgoyne. She also wrote a song about him called "In This Life" which was released on her 1992 album Erotica.

Credits 

 1983: Madonna – "Burning Up" / "Physical Attraction" (Sire Records) – Cover art
 1983: NV – "It's Alright" (Sire Records) – Art concept
 1984: NV – "Let Me Do You" (Sire Records) – Art concept
 1984: Jellybean – Wotupski!?! (EMI America Records) – Design
 1984: Jellybean – "The Mexican" (EMI America Records) – Design
 1986: General Public – Hand To Mouth (I.R.S. Records) – Cover art
 1986: The Jamaica Girls – "On The Move" (Sire Records) – Cover art, Design

References

External links 

 

1963 births
1986 deaths
People from the East Village, Manhattan
Pratt Institute alumni
English emigrants to the United States
People from Greenwich Village
AIDS-related deaths in New York (state)
American gay artists
English gay artists